Dufferin is a civil parish in Charlotte County, New Brunswick, Canada, located east of St. Stephen. It comprises a single local service district (LSD), which is a member of the Southwest New Brunswick Service Commission (SNBSC).

The Census subdivision of the same name shares the parish's boundaries.

Origin of name
The parish was named for the Earl of Dufferin, who was Governor General of Canada at time.

History
Dufferin was erected in 1873 from Saint Stephen Parish.

Boundaries
Dufferin Parish is bounded:

 on the north by the rear line of the tier of grants fronting on the St. Croix River and Pagans Cove;
 on the east by the mouth of Oak Bay;
 on the south by the St. Croix River;
 on the west by the Old Bay Road and Dennis Stream.

Local service district
The local service district of the parish of Dufferin comprises the entire parish.

The LSD was established in 1969 to assess for community services, in this case to provide ambulance service after local funeral homes ceased doing so. Fire protection was added in 1970.

Today the LSD assesses for only the basic LSD services of fire protection, police services, land use planning, emergency measures, and dog control. The taxing authority is 509.00 Dufferin.

Communities
Communities at least partly within the parish.
 Champlain
 Crocker Hill
 The Ledge

Bodies of water
Bodies of water at least partly within the parish.
 St. Croix River
 The Narrows
 Oak Bay

Demographics

Population

Language

Access Routes
Highways and numbered routes that run through the parish, including external routes that start or finish at the parish limits:

Highways
None

Principal Routes
None

Secondary Routes:
None

External Routes:
None

See also
List of parishes in New Brunswick

Notes

References

Parishes of Charlotte County, New Brunswick
Local service districts of Charlotte County, New Brunswick